Hoyt is an unincorporated community and census-designated place (CDP) in Haskell County, Oklahoma, United States. A post office was established at Hoyt, Indian Territory on August 19, 1890. It was named for Babe Hoyt, a local ferryboat operator. The post office closed on April 17, 2004; it still has its own ZIP code, 74440.

It is home to the Hoyt School, which is no longer in use, but has been nominated for classification as an official Oklahoma landmark.

At the time of its founding, Hoyt was located in the Moshulatubbee District of the Choctaw Nation.

Demographics

References

Unincorporated communities in Haskell County, Oklahoma
Unincorporated communities in Oklahoma
Census-designated places in Haskell County, Oklahoma
Census-designated places in Oklahoma